NGC 3550 is a lenticular galaxy in the constellation Ursa Major. It was discovered on April 11, 1785, by William Herschel. It is one of the brightest galaxies of the Abell 1185 galaxy cluster.

References

3550
Lenticular galaxies
Ursa Major (constellation)
033927